Scott Carter may refer to:

Scott Carter (Australia rugby league), Australian rugby league footballer who played in the 1980s and 1990s
Scott Carter (sports administrator), New Zealand sports administrator
Scott William Carter, American fiction writer